Dren Hodja (born 27 March 1994) is a professional footballer who plays as an attacking midfielder for German club FC Gießen. Born in Germany, he represented Albania at under-21 international level.

Early life and youth career
Hodja was in born in Offenbach am Main, Germany from Kosovo Albanians parents from Kosovo, who migrated in Germany due to the Kosovo War in 1992. His father also was a footballer who played as a forward and was a successful goalscorer. He started his youth career at hometown club Kickers Offenbach in 2002. Following the bankruptcy of Kickers Offenbach he decided to sign with FC Schalke 04 in 2013.

Club career
Hodja started playing with FC Schalke 04 II where he debuted on 28 July 2013 against Rot-Weiß Oberhausen as substitute in the 73rd minute for Olivier Caillas. He scored his first goal for Schalke 04 II on 30 November 2013 in the opening moments of the match which finished as 2–4 loss.

He concluded the first season with 23 appearances, 16 as a starter and 2 goals scored.

On 19 July 2014, Hodja played a friendly match with the Schalke 04 first team and scored a goal in a 3–1 win over Hansa Rostock.

Hodja started with goal in another season with Schalke 04 II the 2014–15 where he played 8 matches and in October 2014 he suffered an injury which kept him out of play until the end of the season.

VfR Aalen
On 7 July 2015, Hodja signed with a one-year contract with fellow German club VfR Aalen in 3. Liga. He made it his first professional debut for VfR Aalen on 5 December 2015 against Werder Bremen II coming on as a substitute in the 84th minute in place of Fabian Menig in a 1–1 draw.

Kickers Offenbach
On 29 January 2016, Hodja signed a contract with Kickers Offenbach, the club where he started playing football at the age of 8.

International career
Following his goal with the first team of Schalke 04 in a friendly against Hansa Rostock he declared in an interview for Albanian media that he wanted to play for Albania in international level.

Hodja was called up for the friendly match against Romania U21 on 8 October 2014, but among with two other players based in Germany, Valmir Sulejmani and Leart Paqarada, withdrew because of a possible counter-attack by Germany.

Hodja was called up to participate in the international tournament in Dubai, United Arab Emirates on 12–18 November 2014 he would have been unable to join the U-21 national team due to an injury.

Career statistics

Club

References

External links

1994 births
Living people
Sportspeople from Offenbach am Main
Footballers from Hesse
German people of Albanian descent
German people of Kosovan descent
Kosovo Albanians
Association football midfielders
German footballers
Albanian footballers
Albania youth international footballers
Albania under-21 international footballers
FC Schalke 04 II players
VfR Aalen players
Kickers Offenbach players
FC Gießen players
3. Liga players
Regionalliga players